Andrew G. Bostom is an American author and medical doctor who frequently writes about the subject of Islam. He is an Associate Professor of Medicine at Brown University Medical School.

Profile and career
Bostom, who is Jewish, although "not particularly religious", grew up in New York City, lived in Queens most of his life and went to medical school in Brooklyn. His attention to Islam was started with the September 11 attacks, after which he read "everything" ever written by Bat Ye'or. He met Ye'or after a correspondence with Daniel Pipes, and thereafter brought her to Brown to give a guest lecture, following which she became a "very close" mentor to Bostom. He began writing short essays within a year of 9/11, and wrote his first book with the encouragement of Ibn Warraq.

A polemicist according to C. Krogt (himself an Islam critic), Bostom authored The Legacy of Jihad in 2005, a work which provides an analysis of Jihad based on an exegesis of translations of Islamic primary sources done by other writers on the topic, and was the editor of the 2008 anthology of primary sources and secondary studies on the theme of Muslim antisemitism, The Legacy of Islamic Antisemitism. In October 2012, Bostom published his third compendium Sharia versus Freedom: The Legacy of Islamic Totalitarianism (Prometheus Books). He has published articles in the New York Post, Washington Times, New York Daily News, National Review Online, American Thinker, Pajamas Media, and FrontPage Magazine.

Bostom has stated that Islam and Islamism are "synonymous". This view is criticized by professor Bassam Tibi who states that most Muslims in the world are not Islamists. Matt Carr writing in Race & Class, described Bostom as a "protégé" of Bat Ye’or, and described Bostom's perspective of Islam as reducing to the acronym "‘MPED’ – massacre, pillage, enslavement and deportation". 
Bostom participated in the 2007 and 2008 international counter-jihad conferences, and is regarded as part of the counter-jihad movement.

References

External links
 Andrew G. Bostom's web site
 
21/05/2008, Hudson Institute, Washington DC, The Legacy of Islamic Antisemitism
16/11/2016, Capitol Hill, Sharia Vs Freedom
09/02/2006, Legacy of Jihad

Year of birth missing (living people)
Living people
American non-fiction writers
Brown University faculty
American critics of Islam
Counter-jihad activists